Italian orthography (the conventions used in writing Italian) uses 21 letters of the 26-letter Latin alphabet to write the Italian language. This article focuses on the writing of Standard Italian, based historically on the Florentine dialect, and not the other Italian dialects.

Written Italian is very regular and almost completely phonemic – having an almost one-to-one correspondence between letters (or sequences of letters) and sounds (or sequences of sounds).

Alphabet
The base alphabet consists of 21 letters: five vowels (A, E, I, O, U) and 16 consonants. The letters J, K, W, X and Y are not part of the proper alphabet, and appear only in loanwords (e.g. 'jeans', 'weekend'), foreign names, and in a handful of native words—such as the names Jesolo, Bettino Craxi, and Walter, which all derive from regional languages. In addition, grave and acute accents may modify vowel letters; circumflex accent is much rarer and is found only in older texts.

Double consonants represent true geminates and are pronounced as such: anno 'year', pronounced  (cf. English ten nails). The short–long length contrast is phonemic, e.g. ritto  'upright' vs. rito  'rite, ritual', carro  'cart, wagon' vs. caro  'dear, expensive'.

Vowels
The Italian alphabet has five vowel letters, . Of those, only  represents one sound value, while all others have two.

In stressed syllables,  represents both open  and close . Similarly,  represents both open  and close  (see Italian phonology for further details on those sounds). There is typically no orthographic distinction between the open and close sounds represented, though accent marks are used in certain instances (see below). There are some minimal pairs, called heteronyms, where the same spelling is used for distinct words with distinct vowel sounds. In unstressed syllables, only the close variants occur.

Many exceptions exist (e.g.

C and G

They represent the affricates  and  respectively when they precede a front vowel ( or ).

In these instances, the vowel following the digraph is stressed, and  represents no vowel sound: ciò, giù. An item such as CIA 'CIA', pronounced  with  stressed, contains no digraph.

For words of more than one syllable, stress position must be known in order to distinguish between digraph  or  containing no actual phonological vowel  and sequences of affricate and stressed .

They eventually came to be full phonemes, and orthographic adjustments were introduced to distinguish them. The phonemicity of the affricates can be demonstrated with minimal pairs:

'eyes',   'to dress up'. 'hedgehog',  'worse'.

Between vowels these are pronounced phonetically long, as in  aglio 'garlic',  ogni 'each'. By way of exception,  before  represents  in some words derived from Greek, such as  'wisteria', from learned Latin, such as  'negligent', and in a few adaptations from other languages such as glissando [ɡlisˈsando], partially italianised from French glissant.  before vowels other than  represents straightforward .

Notable examples: cieco  'blind' (homophonous with ceco 'Czech'), cielo  'sky' (homophonous with celo 'I conceal'), scienza  'science'.

Plural of words ending in -cia, -gia is written with -cie, -gie if preceded by a vowel (camicia 'skirt' — camicie 'skirts', valigia 'suitcase' — valigie 'suitcases') or with -ce, ge if preceded by a consonant (provincia 'province' — province 'provinces'). This rule has been established since the 1950s; prior to that, etymological spellings such as valige and provincie were in use.

C and Q
These words all contain a  sequence derived from an original  which was subsequently diphthongised.

S and Z

However, these two phonemes are in complementary distribution everywhere except between two vowels in the same word and, even with such words, there are very few minimal pairs.
 The voiceless  occurs:
 At the start of a word before a vowel (e.g.  ) or a voiceless consonant (e.g.  )
 After any consonant (e.g.  )
 Before a voiceless consonant (e.g.  )
 At the start of the second part of a compound word (e.g. These words are formed by adding a prefix to a word beginning with 
 The voiced  occurs before voiced consonants (e.g.  ).

 It is normally voiceless :
 At the start of a word in which the second syllable starts with a voiceless consonant
,)
 Exceptions:  , all words derived from words obeying other rules (e.g.  , which is derived from )
 After the letter  (e.g.  )
 Exceptions:   and  
 In the suffixes -anza, -enza and -onzolo (e.g.  ,)
 It is normally voiced :
 Exceptions:  ,  
 At the start of a word when followed by two vowels (e.g.  )
 Exceptions:  and its derived terms (see above)
 If it is single (not doubled) and between two single vowels (e.g.  )
 Exceptions:   (from the German pronunciation of )

Generally, intervocalic z is written doubled, but it is written single in most words where it precedes  followed by any vowel and in some learned words.

 may represent either a voiceless alveolar affricate  or its voiced counterpart : voiceless in e.g. The verbal ending -izzare from Greek -ίζειν is always pronounced  (e.g.  ), maintained in both inflected forms and derivations:   'I organise',   'organisation'. , for example, of Latin origin reconstructed as *INDIRECTIARE, has /tts/ in all forms containing the root indirizz-.

Silent H
The letter  is also used in some interjections, where it always comes immediately after the first vowel in the word (e.g. Silent  is also found in some Italian toponyms: Chorio, Dho, Hano, Mathi, Noha, Proh, Rho, Roghudi, Santhià, Tharros, Thiene, Thiesi, Thurio, Vho; and surnames: Dahò, Dehò, De Bartholomaeis, De Thomasis, Matthey, Rahò, Rhodio, Tha, Thei, Theodoli, Thieghi, Thiella, Thiglia, Tholosano, Thomatis, Thorel, Thovez.

J, K, W, X and Y 
The letter J (I lunga 'long I') is not considered part of the standard Italian alphabet; however, it is used in some Latin words, proper nouns (such as Jesi, Letojanni, Juventus etc.), in words borrowed from foreign languages (most common: jeans, but also jazz, jet, jeep, banjo), and in an archaic spelling of Italian.

The letter  represents  in Latin and Italian and dialect words such as Romanesco dialect ajo  ("garlic"; cf.

The letters K (cappa), W (V doppia or doppia V 'double V'), X (ics) and Y (ipsilon or I greca 'Greek I') are not part of the standard Italian alphabet and are used only in unassimilated or partially assimilated loanwords.

The letter  is used in karma, kayak, kiwi, kamikaze, etc.; it is always pronounced .

The letter  is used in web, whisky, water 'water closet / toilet', western 'Western movie', watt, etc. A capital W is used as an abbreviation of viva or evviva ("long live").

In most words, it may be replaced with 's' or 'ss' (with different pronunciation: xilofono/silofono, taxi/tassì) or, rarely, by 'cs' (with the same pronunciation: claxon/clacson).

The letter  is used in yoga, yogurt, yacht, etc.

Diacritics
This use of accents is generally mandatory only to indicate stress on a word-final vowel; elsewhere, accents are generally found only in dictionaries. Since final  is hardly ever close-mid,  is very rarely encountered in written Italian (e.g.

The accents may also be used to differentiate minimal pairs within Italian (for example  'peach' vs.  'fishing'), but in practice this is limited to didactic texts. However, since there are no corresponding low (or lax) vowels to contrast with in Italian, both choices are equally acceptable.

The form with circumflex is found mainly in older texts, though it may still appear in contexts where ambiguity might arise from homography.

Monosyllabic words generally lack an accent (e.g.). Many monosyllabic words are spelled with an accent in order to avoid ambiguity with other words (e.g. ,  versus). This is known as accento distintivo and also occurs in other Romance languages (e.g. the Spanish tilde diacrítica).

Sample text 
"Nel mezzo del cammin di nostra vita

mi ritrovai per una selva oscura

ché la diritta via era smarrita."

Lines 1–3 of Canto 1 of the Inferno, Part 1 of the Divina Commedia by Dante Alighieri, a highly influential poem. Translation (Longfellow): "Midway upon the journey of our life \ I found myself in a dark wood \ for the straight way was lost."

See also
Gian Giorgio Trissino, humanist who proposed an orthography in 1524. Some of his proposals were taken.
Claudio Tolomei, humanist who proposed an orthography in 1525.

Notes

References

External links
 Danesi, Marcel (1996). Italian the Easy way.

Italian language
Indo-European Latin-script orthographies